is the fifth single released by Pink Lady on September 5, 1977. The single topped the Japan charts at number one, having sold 1,650,000 copies, and spent twelve weeks at the top.

Written by Yū Aku and Shunichi Tokura, "Wanted" is about a woman who wants revenge on a man who has run off after stealing her heart.

With "Wanted", Pink Lady made their first appearance on Kōhaku Uta Gassen in 1977. The song also won the "Popular Award" at the 19th Japan Record Awards.

On live performances, Mie and Kei point their microphones at each other for the song's first two lines. Historically, the duo wore 1920s style party dresses (Mie in black and Kei in white) on TV performances of the song.

According to Oricon. this was the third best selling single from 1977.

Pink Lady also recorded an English-language version of "Wanted" in 1978 for international markets as the B-side of "Sergeant Pepper" (the English version of "Pepper Keibu").

A re-recorded version of the song was included on the 2-disc greatest hits release, INNOVATION, released in December 2010.

Track listing (7" vinyl) 
All lyrics are written by Yū Aku; all music is composed and arranged by Shunichi Tokura.

Chart positions

Pink Babies version

The 14-member tribute group Pink Babies released their version of "Wanted" on iTunes on July 16, 2014. The song was also included in their "Nagisa no Sindbad" Type-B single in 2016.

Track listing

Other cover versions
 Yellow Magic Orchestra's live cover version of this song, was featured on their 1993 album Live at the Kinokuniya Hall '78.
 Female vocal/dance group Speed covered the song in the 1997 various artists album VELFARRE J-POP NIGHT presents DANCE with YOU.
 Trasparenza covered the song in their 2002 album Pink Lady Euro Tracks.
 Miz and Shiho (of the group Fried Pride) recorded a cover version for the 2009 Pink Lady/Yū Aku tribute album Bad Friends.
 Kazuya Yoshii covered the song in his 2014 album Yoshii Funk Jr. ~Kore ga Genten!!~.
 Amiaya incorporated the song as part of their "Pink Lady Mash Up 2015" single.

References

External links
 
 

1977 singles
1977 songs
2014 singles
Pink Lady (band) songs
Japanese-language songs
Disco songs
Oricon Weekly number-one singles
Songs about revenge
Songs with lyrics by Yū Aku
Songs with music by Shunichi Tokura
Victor Entertainment singles